Lake freighters, or lakers, are bulk carrier vessels that operate on the Great Lakes of North America. These vessels are traditionally called boats, although classified as ships.

Since the late 19th century, lakers have carried bulk cargoes of materials such as limestone, iron ore, grain, coal, or salt from the mines and fields of the upper Great Lakes to the populous industrial areas farther east. The 63 commercial ports handled 173 million tons of cargo in 2006. Because of winter ice on the lakes, the navigation season is not usually year-round. The Soo Locks and Welland Canal close from mid-January to late March, when most boats are laid up for maintenance. Crew members spend these months ashore.

Depending on their application, lakers may also be referred to by their types, such as oreboats or ironboats (primarily for iron ore), straight deckers (no self-unloading gear), bulkers (carry bulk cargo), sternenders (all cabins aft), self unloaders (with self-unloading gear), longboats (for their slender appearance), or lakeboats, among others.

In the mid-20th century, 300 lakers worked the lakes, but by the early 21st century, there were fewer than 140 active lakers. , which sank in 1975, became widely known as the most recent and largest major vessel to be wrecked on the Great Lakes.

Lakers vs. salties
By way of the Saint Lawrence Seaway, smaller lakers have access to the Atlantic Ocean, and some ocean-going vessels have access to the lakes. Visiting ocean-going vessels are called "salties". Many modern ocean-going vessels are too large for the relatively small locks on the Saint Lawrence Seaway, so large salties cannot travel farther inland than Montreal, Quebec.

Because one of the Soo Locks is larger than any Seaway lock, salties that can pass through the Seaway may travel anywhere in the Great Lakes. Conversely, the largest lakers are confined to the upper lakes (Superior, Michigan, Huron, Erie) because they are too large to use the Seaway locks, beginning at the Welland Canal that bypasses the Niagara River.

Because of their deeper draft and the lower buoyancy of fresh water, salties may accept partial loads on the Great Lakes, "topping off" upon exiting the Seaway.

Cargo 

Lakers are generally bulk carriers; that is, they carry cargoes of rock, ore, salt or grain in large contiguous holds, not packed in containers. The earlier ships required rail cars unloading on ore docks and unloading machinery at the receiving docks, but modern lakers are self unloaders, allowing them to unload faster and in more ports.

The most common cargoes on the Great Lakes are taconite, limestone, grain, salt, coal, cement, gypsum, sand, slag, and potash. Much of the cargo supplies the steel mills of the auto industry, centered around the Great Lakes because of the ease of transport. Other destinations include coal-fired power plants, highway department salt domes, and stone docks, where limestone is unloaded for the construction industry. U.S.-flagged freighters carried the largest portion of the trade, accounting for two-thirds of all cargo by weight. U.S. hulls carried most of the iron, limestone and cement, while Canadian boats carried most of the potash, and almost all of the salt and grain moved on the lakes.

Destination harbors, ship sizes and legal restrictions greatly affect the pattern of haulage. Large U.S. ships hauled most of the iron ore on the lakes (79%) from U.S. mines to U.S. mills. This reflects the requirement of the Jones Act, as well as the industry using large volumes of material while being concentrated in a few large harbor locations. Salt and Canadian grain can be hauled to numerous smaller ports of either country on smaller, mostly Canadian, ships, which can also enter the St. Lawrence Seaway with the Canadian ports of Montreal and Quebec City.

Size 

The largest vessels on the lakes are the 1000-footers (300 m). A dozen of these ships were built between 1976 and 1981, and all remain in service today.

Stewart J. Cort was the first 1000-footer to be put into service on the lakes and also the only one built in the traditional wheelhouse-forward Great Lakes style (although all accommodations are forward, and the stern deckhouse is occupied by self unloading equipment and the engines). Stewart J. Cort started life in Mississippi as Hull 1173, consisting of only the bow and stern sections (and appropriately nicknamed "Stubby"). From there, she was sailed to Erie, Pennsylvania, where she was cut in half and an additional 800+ feet of hull were added. Another interesting 1000-footer is Presque Isle, an integrated tug and barge combination. Presque Isle is the largest tug / barge composite in the world.

All of the 1000-footers are U.S. vessels. The reason for this standard length is the Welland Canal, which bypasses the Niagara Falls.

Another reason for the lack of larger Canadian vessels is legislative in nature. Larger ships on the lakes are generally used to transport American-mined ore bound for American mills. Because of the Jones Act, Canadian ships cannot carry ore from American mines to American mills; ergo larger Canadian ships are not needed.

More common are lake boats in the  classes, because of the limitations of the Welland Canal. These vessels vary greatly in configuration and cargo capacity, being capable of hauling between 10,000 and 40,000 tons per trip depending on the individual boat. These smaller boats can serve smaller harbors around the lakes which have irregular need for their services. The latest major vessel built for bulk cargoes on the lakes is the articulated tug/barge combination Ken Boothe Sr./Lakes Contender. The 740-foot barge Lakes Contender and the  tug Ken Boothe Sr. entered service in 2012.

List of 1000-footers on the lakes 

 Bulk freighters (self-unloaders)



 
 Most powerful engines on the Great Lakes.
 First standard construction 1000-footer

 ( × ) Largest vessel on Great Lakes
 First 1000-footer on the lakes


 Highest cargo capacity
Tug/barge combination (ITB)
 ( × ) Only 1000-foot tug/barge unit

Design 

Because these vessels must traverse the locks of the Great Lakes Waterway, they all have features in common, and their appearance differs from similarly sized ocean-going freighters. For instance, they are narrower and generally longer. An early variation of the type (designed by Alexander McDougall and built from 1887 through 1898) was the "whaleback" design, which featured significant tumblehome in the sides of the hull and a rounded bow, looking rather like the back of a whale. Whereas the superstructure of an ordinary freighter had the bridge in the center of the vessel, beginning in the late 1800s lake freighters typically had the bridge and associated superstructure at the bow. Traditionally they had a second island, over the engine room in the stern. These dual-cabin boats were constructed between 1869 and 1974. R. J. Hackett premiered the style, and the second Algosoo was the final vessel designed this way. More recently built lakers, like CSL Niagara, have a single large superstructure island at the stern.

Vessel speeds are not as important on the lakes as on the ocean. Ports are often closer together than in ocean trade, so cargo capacity is more important than speed. Lake vessels are designed with the greatest block coefficient to maximize the vessel's size in the locks within the Great Lakes/St Lawrence Seaway system. Therefore, ship designers have favored bluff bows over streamlined bows. After World War II, several ocean freighters and tankers were transported to the Great Lakes and converted to bulk carriers as a way to acquire ships cheaply. Several of them continue to sail today (e.g., Lee A. Tregurtha and a few others).

Another distinguishing feature of lake vessels versus ocean vessels is the cargo hatch configuration. This configuration was needed to match the hatches to the loading facilities. At the turn of the 19th century, most ore loading facilities had loading chutes spaced every . The ship designers used this pattern for their hatch configuration. This pattern continues today, even with modern lake vessels, therefore a lake vessel has many more hatches than an ocean vessel of equal length.

Because of size restrictions, there are currently thirty vessels on the lakes that can only pass between Lake Superior and Lake Huron using Poe Lock, although none approaches the lock's size. Since Great Lakes waves do not achieve the great length or period of ocean waves, particularly compared to the waves' height, ships are in less danger of being suspended between two waves and breaking, so the ratio between the ship's length, beam and its depth can be larger than that of an ocean-going ship. The lake vessels generally have a 10:1 length to beam ratio, whereas ocean vessels are typically 7:1. The dimensions of the locks is the determining factor in lake vessel construction.

Lifespan 

Since the fresh water lakes are less corrosive to ships than the salt water of the oceans, many of the lakers remain in service for long periods, and the fleet has a much higher average age than the ocean-going fleet. The average lifespan of a laker is 40–50 years. Until 2014, built in 1906 as William P. Snyder, was the oldest ship in active duty on the lakes. She was managed by Port City Steamship and owned by St. Mary's Cement, a subsidiary of Votorantim Cimentos. E. M. Ford had one of the longest careers, having been built in 1898 (as Presque Isle – ) and still sailing the lakes 98 years later in 1996. In 2007, she was still afloat as a stationary transfer vessel at a riverside cement silo in Saginaw. She went to the scrap yard in November 2010 at Purvis Marine in Sault Ste. Marie, Ontario. , built in 1904, last sailed in 1985 and in 2007 served in the same capacity as E. M. Ford at a cement silo in Superior, Wisconsin. Several decorated World War II veteran ships are still in active, although civilian, use such as the tankers Chiwawa and Neshanic (scrapped 2018), now the bulk freighters Lee A. Tregurtha and American Victory, respectively, and the Landing Craft Tank 203, now the working vessel Outer Island.

Newest freighters
Some shipping companies are building new freighters to ply the waters of the Great Lakes. The following are new freighters in use or will be launched for use in the Great Lakes:

  – built by Chengxi Shipyard of Jiangyin, China, delivered in August 2011 for Algoma Central Corporation.
  – a new class of lake freighter, several of which entered service in the 2010s for Seaway Marine Transport, a division of Algoma Central. A class of vessel is created any time a new design is used to build a ship and is notable when multiple ships are built to the same design plans. The ships are used as dry-bulk lake freighters (two gearless bulk freighter and three self-unloading vessel). The first in the series, was launched in 2013.
  – a new class of lake freighter delivered for Canada Steamship Lines in 2012 and 2013 (and ). An additional pair (CSL Welland and CSL St. Laurent) began service on the Great Lakes in 2015.
  – a new class of lake freighter, one of which, was commissioned by Interlake Steamship Company and got underway on 1 July 2022.

Ship losses and incidents

The Great Lakes have a long history of shipwreck, groundings, storms and collisions. From the 1679 sinking of Le Griffon with its cargo of furs to the 1975 loss of Edmund Fitzgerald, thousands of ships and thousands of lives have been lost, and many involved vessels in the cargo trade. The Great Lakes Shipwreck Museum uses the approximate figures of 6,000 ships and 30,000 lives lost. David D. Swayze has compiled a list which details over 4,750 well-documented shipwrecks, mostly of commercial vessels and a list of known names of over 5,000 victims of those sinkings. Maritime historian Mark Thompson reports that based on nautical records, nearly 6,000 shipwrecks on the Great Lakes occurred between 1878 and 1994, with about a quarter of those being listed as total losses with a total of 1,166 lives lost.

The most recent losses of modern lakers were:
, May 11, 1953, Lake Superior, 17 of 31 crew died, (flooded after the cargo hatch covers were lost during a storm)
, June 20, 1953, Lake Superior, 1 of 29 crew died, (rammed by freighter Burlington in heavy fog)
, November 18, 1958, Lake Michigan, 33 of 35 crew died, (split in half by hogging during a storm)
, May 7, 1965, Straits of Mackinac, 10 of 35 crew died, (collision with the saltie Topdalsfjord)
, November 29, 1966, Lake Huron, 28 of 29 crew died, (split in half by hogging during a storm)
, November 10, 1975, Lake Superior, 29 of 29 crew died, (unknown cause during a storm)
The salties Prins Willem V and Monrovia also sank in the Great Lakes during the 1950s; both in collisions with other ships. The saltie Francisco Morazan was a total loss after running aground off South Manitou Island on November 29, 1960. Another saltie Nordmeer grounded on Thunder Bay Island Shoal in November 1966, but before it could be refloated, it was further damaged in the same storm that sank the Morrell and was declared a total loss.

Ships on the lakes have been involved in many lesser incidents. Lakers have been subject to frequent groundings in ports and channels because of varying lake levels and silting, collisions with objects (such as the 1993 collision of the Indiana Harbor with the Lansing Shoals Light Station), icing in during winter trips and shipboard fires (including the unusual case in 2001 where a drawbridge ran into the Canadian grain carrier Windoc causing a fire). To prevent collisions and groundings, the Great Lakes are well-served with lighthouses and lights, and floating navigation aids. The U.S. Coast Guard and Canadian Coast Guard maintain stations around the Great Lakes including icebreakers and rescue helicopters. The U.S. Army Corps of Engineers and other agencies maintain the harbors and seaways to limit groundings by dredging and seawalling.

November was the traditional last month of shipping before the winter layup (and lake freeze-up). During November, much of the worst weather of the navigation season occurs which has resulted in a disproportionate number of accidents. One study shows that over half of all strandings and one-third of all vessels lost to foundering between 1900–1950 were lost during November.

Famous vessels 

The first laker with self-unloading equipment was Hennepin (formerly George H. Dyer) a small wooden laker that was refitted with the equipment in 1902. The first laker built as a self-unloader was Wyandotte launched in 1908. Before these, all boats were unloaded with shoreside equipment. Self-unloading equipment worked well for cargoes that could "flow" out of the holds onto belts, such as coal and limestone. It did not work well for grain, which flowed too readily and would spill off the conveyors, or iron ore, which would not flow well and would hang up in the hold. Because the predominant cargo for lakers was iron ore, self-unloaders did not become common until higher grade ores were depleted and taconite pellets were developed in the 1970s. 

Steam power first appeared in the 1860s and became the standard source of power for over a century. The Canadian grainboat Feux Follets of 1967 was the last laker to be built with a steam turbine and thus was the last steamer built on the lakes. Diesel powerplants did not become standard until the 1970s. The last active ships of 1920s vintage, and the oldest ships still operating in non-specialized bulk trades is the motor vessels Maumee of Lower Lakes Transportation. She was built as William G Clyde for US Steel. S. T. Crapo, inactive since 1996, was built to haul cement for Huron Cement Co. back in 1927 and was the second ship of that design, the first being John G Boardman of the same company. S. T. Crapo was the last coal burning freighter on the Great Lakes.

The first iron-hulled laker was Brunswick, launched at Detroit in 1881. Brunswick sank after a collision later that year and was apparently little known. Many follow the lead of the contemporary Cleveland press and credit  as the first iron-hulled laker, launched in 1882. Onokos higher center section did become a standard for later lakers. At , Onoko was the first bulk carrier to hold the unofficial title of "Queen of the Lakes" (longest vessel on the lakes). (1927–1958 ) held the title for 22 years, longer than any other laker of the classic design. Carl D. Bradley is also known for breaking her back and foundering in a Lake Michigan storm in 1958. There were only two survivors.

Currently the title of "Queen of the Lakes" is held by the modern stern-ender Paul R. Tregurtha. Wilfred Sykes (1949 – ) is considered to be the first of the modern lakers, and when converted to a self-unloader in 1975 was the first to have the equipment mounted aft. Since then all self-unloading equipment has been mounted aft. Algoisle (formerly Silver Isle) (1962 – ) was the first modern laker built with all cabins aft (a "stern-ender"), following the lead of ocean-going bulk carriers and reprising a century old form used by little river steam barges and the whalebacks. Stewart J. Cort (1971) was the first 1,000-footer and the only "footer" built in the classic cabins-fore-and-aft style. (1974–2015 ) was the last laker built in the classic style.

Also of note is the steamer , widely known for her artistic design and being the only remaining straight-decked (without self unloading machinery) freighter still in active service on the US side of the Great Lakes (the only other US straight decker still listed is John Sherwin, has not sailed since 1981 and is currently docked in Detour, Michigan after conversion to a self-unloader and repowering was halted in November 2008). In the summer of 2006, Edward L. Ryerson was fitted out and put into service following a long-term lay-up that began in 1998. Edward L. Ryerson was often used as a museum boat for tours. She was put back into service because of a lack of reliable hulls on the lakes, and a need for more tonnage. (The Canadian fleet retains a number of active straight-deckers for use in transporting grain, which is not well suited for self-unloading equipment. Most US grain is currently transported by rail.)

Serving as the setting of the movie version of David Mamet's play Lakeboat, the Canadian straight decker Seaway Queen, formerly owned by Upper Lakes Shipping and since scrapped (see below), temporarily flew a U.S. flag and displayed Chicago as her homeport for some shots.

Museum ships and boats, surviving hulls

Cleveland, Ohio 
, a laker built in 1925 and a former flagship for the Cleveland-Cliffs Iron Company, has been turned into a maritime museum and is open to the public in Cleveland in the North Coast Harbor.

Duluth-Superior, Minnesota-Wisconsin 
 was named for the president of U.S. Steel at the time of her launching and served as the flagship of US Steel's Great Lakes fleet from her launch in 1938 to 1975. She was the first laker to incorporate welding in its design and is open for tours at the Great Lakes Floating Maritime Museum in Duluth, Minnesota. Another museum ship, is the last surviving ship of the whaleback design, and is a museum in Superior, Wisconsin, which was the location of the American Steel Barge Company, where the whalebacks were built. McDougall Duluth Shipbuilding Company built lakers in Duluth.

Sault Ste. Marie, Michigan 
 was built in 1917 and served the National Steel Corporation, the Republic Steel Corporation, and Wilson Transit Co. during her 1917–1966 working life. She became a museum ship on the waterfront of the 'American Soo', east of the Soo Locks, in 1968.  She holds many relics of the sinking of  including two of Edmund Fitzgeralds mauled lifeboats.

Toledo, Ohio 
  is a former Cleveland-Cliffs Iron Company vessel that sailed from 1911 to 1980. She was originally owned by the Shenango Furnace Company, but renamed the Willis B. Boyer under Cleveland Cliffs ownership. Col. James M. Schoonmaker was the largest bulk freighter in the world when commissioned. In one of the most ambitious Great Lakes ship restorations to date, Col. James M. Schoonmaker was re-christened July 1, 2011, on the 100th anniversary of the ship's launching in Toledo.  She was open to the public for many years as a museum at International Park in Toledo, Ohio but was moved October 27, 2012, to a location downriver, next to the new home of the National Museum of the Great Lakes. She reopened to the public in Spring 2014, when the museum opened.

Other surviving hulls and partial ships

DeTour, Michigan 
Lewis G. Harrimans bow and bow superstructure are preserved here.  Lewis G. Harriman, launched as the purpose-built cement steamer John W. Boardman, was scrapped but the bow was saved as a DeTour residence.  Recently restored to the Boardman colors.

Put-In-Bay, Ohio 
Benson Ford was named after Henry Ford's grandson, and was the flagship of the Ford Motor Company (1924). The forward cabin is now located on a cliff on South Bass Island in Lake Erie, where it was moved in 1986 by Frank J. Sullivan and Lydia Sullivan from Cleveland, Ohio. It is a private museum residence owned by Bryan Kasper of Sandusky, Ohio since 1999.  It has been featured in many magazines and national television shows such as HGtv's Extreme Homes and Travel Channel's Extreme Vacation Homes.

Mississauga, Ontario 
SS Ridgetown was partially sunk as a breakwater (with stack and cabins intact) near Toronto at Port Credit.  It was built in 1905 and is one of the oldest surviving hulls on the lake. Its silhouette provides an example of the appearance of early 1900s lake freighters.

Detroit, Michigan
The pilot house of William Clay Ford is part of the Dossin Great Lakes Museum on Belle Isle. The pilot house is open for tours and overlooks the Detroit River.

Failed museum attempts, ships scrapped 

Several other lakers nearly became museums, but were scrapped for lack of funding, political opposition, and other causes.

 Lewis G. Harriman: a 1923 purpose-built cement carrier, the first of her kind, that sailed from her launch until 1980. Used as a storage barge until 2003, a group tried to save her but bad communications within the company saw the ship sold in 2004 and scrapped in Sault Ste. Marie by Purvis Marine. The majority of the hull was fed to the Algoma Steel Mill but the forecastle was saved as a summer cottage at Detour, Michigan.
 SS Niagara: 1897-built freighter, later converted to a sand-sucker. Scrapped in 1997 by Liberty Iron & Metal of Erie, Pennsylvania, after a failed attempt to convert her into a museum in Erie. She had been saved from the scrapyard 11 years earlier.
 John Ericsson: The second-to-last whaleback freighter. John Ericsson was scrapped in 1969 in the city of Hamilton, Ontario. Politics, as was the case with Canadiana, played a central role in the loss of the ship.
 SS Seaway Queen: The Canadian straight decker Seaway Queen, formerly owned by Upper Lakes Shipping, and the setting for the movie version of David Mamet's play Lakeboat, was involved in an attempt to save her as a museum. In the end, the company failed to locate an organization that was capable and willing to preserve her and she was sold and scrapped in Alang, India, in 2004.
 J. B. Ford: 1904 freighter that survived the 1905 Mataafa storm and the Great Lakes Storm of 1913 with the last three-cycle reciprocating steam engine was too expensive to turn into a museum and was sent to Azcon Metals in Duluth to be scrapped in 2015.

Future museum potential 

 Cement steamers: The cement fleet of steamers is rapidly being supplanted by tug/barge combinations like the Integrity and Innovation. The SS St. Marys Challenger has been converted into a barge, though her wheelhouse is sitting on a dock in Toledo, Ohio, waiting to become part of the National Museum of the Great Lakes.
 . launched in 1952, is still running. She is famous for having had the last contact with Edmund Fitzgerald before the latter sank. She was also the first would-be rescue vessel to search for Edmund Fitzgerald.
SS Lee A Tregurtha is the second oldest being notable for being a former US Navy fleet oiler and being a surviving Cleveland Cliffs vessel.

See also

Canal
Glossary of nautical terms
Great Lakes Maritime Academy, training center for merchant mariners on the Great Lakes
Great Lakes passenger steamers
Great Lakes Storm of 1913
Great Lakes Waterway
Merchant vessel
Navigability
Ship transport
Watercraft
Waterway

References

External links 

 Boatnerd website
 Willis B. Boyer website
 William G. Mather website
 Valley Camp website
 Norisle website
 Great Lakes Naval Memorial & Museum – USS Silversides & USCGC McLane

+
 Freighter
Ship types